Handy Manny is a CGI-animated children's television series that premiered with its first two episodes consecutively on Saturday, September 16, 2006, originally as part of Disney Channel's Playhouse Disney block. On Valentine's Day 2011, the series moved to the Disney Junior block, which served as Playhouse Disney's replacement.

The titular character (as well as his counterpart from old Sheetrock Hills) are both voiced by Wilmer Valderrama. The show was created by Roger Bollen and Marilyn Sadler, and developed for TV by Rick Gitelson. The show's animation was produced by Canada-based Nelvana, and features the additional voice talents of Dee Bradley Baker, Tom Kenny, Fred Stoller, Nika Futterman, Kath Soucie, Carlos Alazraqui, Grey DeLisle, and Nancy Truman. The theme song is performed by Los Lobos.

Overview
The series is set in the fictional town of Sheetrock Hills where the titular character, Manny (whose full name is Manuel Esteves Garcia III), owns a repair shop where he works with his anthropomorphic talking tools. It is unknown exactly where this town is located, but there are a multitude of Spanish speaking residents within it and the town is surrounded by tropical plants and ocean water (as seen in the Main Title Theme of every episode and as well as seen sometimes during the end of them). This would place Sheetrock Hills in Ventura County in California, as the hills seen in the Main Title Themes are similar to the Simi Hills mountains of Ventura County as well as Los Angeles County, California. Whether this was a coincidence or done on purpose is unknown. Most thirty-minute episodes contain two stories. They typically begin with Manny and the tools interacting in Manny's repair shop. While there, someone, usually needing something repaired or assembled, calls Manny, who answers, "Hola, Handy Manny's Repair Shop. You break it..." and then the Tools shout "We fix it!" After hearing who needs help where, Manny and the Tools sing "Hop Up, Jump In" while the Tools hop into his tool box. In each episode (except for Uncle Manny, the only episode where Mr. Lopart isn't seen at all) when Manny and the Tools leave for the repair, they see Mr. Lopart with his pet cat Fluffy in front of (or inside) his candy store. Mr. Lopart would try to do something on his own without any prior experience. Manny offers him to help but Mr. Lopart says that he doesn't need any help, after Manny and the Tools leave the item Mr. Lopart was building would malfunction and cause a mess. Once Manny and the tools arrive at the repair site, they collaborate on the best way to fix the broken item. Manny then goes to Kelly's hardware store where she almost always has the item that they need. Once they have the items needed for the repair, they go back to the work-site and sing "Fix It Right" while performing the repairs. In each episode, the item is fixed.

Episodes

Characters
 Manny (voiced by Wilmer Valderrama) is a third-generation Mexican-American repairman who lives in Sheetrock Hills. He has brown eyes and brown hair, and carries a pencil behind his ear. He wears a red and white hat, a green shirt, blue jeans, brown boots, and a yellow tool belt with a silver buckle. In the episode “Snow Day”, Abuelito, Manny's paternal grandfather, reveals he never saw snow before moving to Sheetrock Hills, thus providing an explanation for Manny's Mexican roots and confirming that Manny is in fact a Mexican American. The roots of anyone on his mother's side of his family is unknown, as Abuelito is the only grandparent of Manny to be seen on screen or even mentioned in the series.
 Kelly (voiced by Nancy Truman) is a hardware store owner. She lives in Sheetrock Hills with her friends and family. Kelly has a teenage brother named Elliot. It was explained in various episodes that Kelly loves keeping toys behind her desk for Manny and the tools to give to Chico as gifts. Her family name is Crenshaw. Kelly almost always has the materials that Manny and the tools need for their projects.
 Mr. Lopart (voiced by Tom Kenny) is the owner of a candy store next to Manny's workshop. He is a middle-aged man who lives a happy life with his cat Fluffy (also voiced by Tom Kenny).  His mother is Mrs. Lopart (who is voiced by Marion Ross) and he has twin nephews named Lyle and Leland.
 Felipe (voiced by Carlos Alazraqui) is a yellow Phillips-head screwdriver (hence his name) who always considers himself to be a very important tool. He is always overconfident and popular about himself. He sometimes thinks of himself as a superhero. Sometimes, his ideas make a problem worse. He provides a lot of the Spanish language content in the show, translating for the other tools. He also loves to sing, but is not very good at it. He usually gets under Turner's skin and his headache, sometimes purposely. He bonds with Flicker and tries to bond with Turner. He also bonds with Pat sometimes.
 Turner (voiced by Dee Bradley Baker) is a violet flat-head screwdriver who appears to be sarcastic and is bossy to Felipe, usually going against Felipe's overconfidence. There are some cases where he shows a genuinely caring relationship with Felipe. In the season one episode "Supremoguy", Felipe needs rescuing and Turner is the first to say "I'll get ya". Also in the episode "Breakfast of Champions", when Felipe feels worn out, he shows genuine concern for him.  He appears to have a secret soft spot for babies and animals (including birds, kittens, and butterflies) and for dancing, even crying in "Handy Manny and The 7 Tools", although he loudly denies it. In the episode "Tools for Toys", he is easily liked by Mr. Singh's daughter, Leela. In the same episode, she kisses him at the top of the head and he blushes. Turner loses his patience with Pat due to his lack of intelligence and with Rusty due to his fear of many things.
 Pat (voiced by Tom Kenny) is a sky blue claw hammer who is talkative, extremely silly and dumb, an idealistic tool, clumsy and not so intelligent, though he does have flashes of cleverness from time to time. He sometimes finds it hard to control his strength. His catchphrase is "I'm a hammer". He is obsessed with nails. It is hinted that he is Rusty's best friend because he is usually the first to comfort him. His lack of intelligence annoys Turner.
 Dusty (voiced by Kath Soucie)  is a red hand saw who is very smart and gives good advice. She acts as the big sister of the group and is very good with detective work by solving mysteries. She also bonds with almost all the other tools. Dusty doesn't have eyelashes despite the fact she is a female tool except when she dresses as a ballerina; which consists of a bow and a tutu. Her talent is ballet.
 Squeeze (voiced by Nika Futterman) is a green pair of pliers. She loves to lend a helping hand, and is sometimes impatient to fix something (usually repairs that involve bolts). She also appears to be giggly, girly, and preppy. Her childlike cuteness makes her a very loveable tool. Before Flicker was introduced, she was considered the baby among the tools. 
 Stretch (also voiced by Nika Futterman) is a pink tape measure who loves to measure things. He can speak out accurate measurements, has a very mathematical mind, has a good memory, He knows everything especially for numbers and measurements and can use his tape as an extendable hand. He bonds with almost every tool. He speaks with a lisp.
 Rusty (voiced by Fred Stoller) is an orange monkey wrench who is not very brave and is a worrier and frightened of everything, generally being frightened of pretty much anything. Most of the time he needs reassurance from his fellow tools and Manny. It is hinted that Pat is his best friend because he is usually the first to comfort him. Sometimes his fear of stuff allows the others to lose patience with him, mainly Turner. He bonds with Pat, Dusty, and Squeeze. He is the second-oldest tool but his intense fear of stuff makes him seem younger than he really is. In "Firefighter Manny", Rusty knows how to be not scared to be a firefighter tool.
 Flicker (voiced by Grey DeLisle) is Manny's youngest tool (first appearing in season 2) is a marigold and blue flashlight with freckles who speaks Spanish and is still learning English (In the Filipino dub, he speaks English and learning Filipino), slowly picking up more of the language throughout season 3. He flashes his light whenever he feels excited. In Handy Manny's School for Tools, he seems to be fully bilingual. He is shown to love food. Felipe has to translate what he says sometimes.
 Fix-It is a robotic dog who lives in Manny's shop and is most likely to be Squeeze's best friend.
 Mrs. Portillo (voiced by Shelley Morrison) is a bakery shop owner and one of Manny's good neighbors. She has two grandsons named Alex and Quinn. She became Manny's paternal step-grandmother once she married Abuelito in the episode, "Wedding Day", the same episode where it was revealed that her full name is Pilar Vargas Portillo and where Manny says that his full name was passed down from Abuelito (which would make Abuelito's full name Manuel Esteves Garcia I or Sr.) which is why Manny's full name is Manuel Esteves Garcia III (which makes Manny's father's full name Manuel Esteves Garcia Jr. or II). Initially in the Series Finale, Manny calls her Mrs. Portillo but later Abuelita. In that same episode, Kelly and Mr. Lopart call her Mrs. Portillo-Garcia. Whether Mrs. Portillo changed her name at all or not remains forever unknown. Her first husband has never been seen or mentioned on the show (except for when Abuelito, referring to himself and Mrs. Portillo, said "we have both been married before"). Abuelito's previous marriage before Mrs. Portillo is presumably the one to Manny's paternal grandmother. Whether she died or she and Abuelito divorced remains forever unknown. This is the same case with Mrs. Portillo, as whether her first husband died or they divorced also forever remains unknown. Mrs. Portillo has a Chihuahua named Carlos (voiced by Frank Welker), who debuted in the episode "Detective Dusty". In that same episode, Mrs. Portillo revealed Carlos to be a gift from her sister.
 Mr. Kumar (voiced by Brian George) is Manny's friend. He has brown skin, black-blue hair, and brown eyes. He wears a white shirt and blue vest with yellow buttons, purple pants, and brown shoes.
 Jackie Greenway (voiced by Jane Lynch) works at the local park and a good friend to Manny and his tools.
 Mrs. Thompson (voiced by Tonye Patano) owns a laundromat and is a teacher at the local preschool. She once helped Kelly with her dress for a party.
 Abuelito (voiced by Carlos Alazraqui) is Manny's grandfather, who is retired and likes to spend time with Manny and the tools. He enjoys fishing and knows a lot about Aztec history.
 Mayor Rosa (voiced by Nancy Truman) is the mayor of Sheetrock Hills and a friend of Manny and the tools. She has Manny's help with the community park.
 Mrs. Lopart (voiced by Marion Ross) is Mr. Lopart's mother and they have a great mother-son bond. She likes to knit and baking cookies. She is very good at bowling which she played for the first time in Bowling Night. Her favorite color is purple.
 Zip (voiced by Eddie Deezen) is one of the automobic team in "The Tools New Team". He first met Stretch and Felipe. He talks fast, knows it all and works super fast as Spinner and Felipe. Zip is a power socket tool.
 Sneeze (voiced by Tom Kenny) is an aquamarine and orange vacuum cleaner and one of the Automotive Team. He sneezes saw dust and other things. In The Tools New Team, Manny meets Sneeze hiding in one of the boxes. He has a long nose as an elephant and his dream is to become an actor in "Handy Manny and The 7 Tools". He is also friends with Elliot. His first appearance is "The Tools New Team".
 Ticks (voiced by Jesse Corti) and Totts (voiced by Cristobal Parson) are two socket wrench twin brothers. They each speak English and Spanish. They both meet Dusty and Flicker as they overheard them. They each has six sides like fixing Marcelo's bike. They are one of the automobic team.
 Roland (voiced by Bill Fagerbakke) is the biggest, giant, red rolling toolbox. He can be clumsy like Pat and he forgets all the time. His snoring is so loud. He also carries the automobic team. His drawers are often seen opened with the automobic team inside the drawers. He is shown to be gluttonous as shown when he ate the chips when serving food and beverages on the plane in "Hank's Birthday". Roland meets Pat and Squeeze. He is one of the automobic team.
 Lefty (voiced by Mark Decarlo), Lily (voiced by Grey DeLisle), and Junior (voiced by Kath Soucie) are combination wrenches and a happy family. They all met Turner and Rusty. Lily can be emotional at times. Lily is overprotective to Junior. Junior can be shy sometimes. Lefty knows that Junior can do his best. He is also shown to have a close father-son relationship with Junior as well. Junior is as cheerful as Squeeze. They are part of the automobic team.
 Beamer (voiced by Steve Moreno) is a wobbly laser level. He first appeared in "Art Show" at Kelly's hardware store. Beamer knows how to straighten things out. Beamer later got adopted by Carmella as her own tool.
 Spinner (voiced by Carlos Alazraqui) is one of the two power tools. He considered the fastest power drill in Concrete Falls, which he is best friends with Jack. Also appears in Big Construction Job.
 Jack (voiced by Daran Norris) is a jackhammer and one of Manny's power tools. He can go fast too just like Spinner, and which Jack only appears in Big Construction Job.
 Pinzas (voiced by Kath Soucie) are a pair of needle nose pliers who shares his character with Squeeze. Only appears in School for Tools.
 Carmela (voiced by Yeni Alvarez) is an old friend of Manny. She loves painting, sculpting, and helping others. She even flirts at Manny sometimes. She has purple pigtails, green shirt with overall.
 Julieta (voiced by Isabella Pajaro) is a granddaughter of Senor Sanchez who loves to play, flowers, ballet, soccer and like to hang out with her friends, and she has a pet kitty named Patches. When Julieta and Senor Sanchez moved to a new home, Julieta thought that there's a monster in the closet, but there's no monster in her closet, it's just her toy bear. She has two pink bows with her pigtails, brown eyes, pink shirt and a light purple skirt.
 Chico (voiced by Mindy Burbano) is a nephew of Manny, and he loves to see him and his tools with her Mother Lola and he likes to play and he's curious of things.
 Paulette (voiced by Giada De Laurentiis) only appeared in Paulette's Pizza Palace, and she loves to make pizza. In that episode, her dough rolling machine is broken, so Manny and the tools come to fix the dough rolling machine, so Paulette can make pizza quick.
 Susana (voiced by Isabella Pajaro) is a little girl who loves dolls and has a baby sister named Isabela. She used to be worried about having a baby, because she thought that her parents won't love her anymore, but that's not true, she learned about that with the help of Manny and the tools. She has brown hair, a pink hair clip, a white blouse with a magenta skirt.
 Mrs. Hillary (voiced by Kathie Lee Gifford) is the music teacher at Sheetrock Hills Elementary School. She loves the sound of music.
 Marcelo (voiced by Sebastian Guerrero) is the son of Mr. and Mrs. Ayala. He used to live in Argentina, then he moved to Sheetrock Hills. He loves to play soccer, make friends and his family.
 Senor Lopez (voiced by Mario Lopez) is the science teacher and meteorologist.
 Tanya (voiced by Dawnn Lewis) is the vendor of the ice cream stand. She likes to give people any flavors of ice cream, but then one day her freezer is broken so she called Manny and the tools to fix it before the ice cream started to melt.
 Aunt Ginny (voiced by Florence Henderson) is the director of Snow White and the seven tools, the owner of Sheetrock Hills Playhouse Theatre, and she loves plays and her family too. She wears a green coat with orange trim, dark green markings, purple pants, 1950's cat-eyed glasses, magenta hair, and a yellow headband.
 Dr Ortega (voiced by Rosario Dawson) is a marine biologist. She likes to take care of animals and studying sea animals. She appeared on "A Whale of a Tale", "Seal Appeal" and "Beach Clean Up", and with the help of Manny and the tools, things turned out well.

Special guests
Special guest stars in the series have included...

 Lance Bass as Elliot 
 Stephanie Sheh as Lola
 Kurtwood Smith as Mr. Noodlander 
 Shelley Morrison as Mrs. Portillo 
 Fred Willard as Dwayne 
 Penn Jillette as Magic Marty 
 Jane Lynch as Jackie 
 Jon Polito as Joe Boletero 
 Ashley Parker Angel as Will
 Wendie Malick as Miss Violet
 Brian George as Mr. Kumar 
 Shannon Durig as Aurelia 
 Marion Ross as Mrs. Lopart
 Henry Winkler as Mr Diller
 Dale Earnhardt Jr. as Chase Davis
 Freddy Rodriguez as Reuben
 Ed O'Neill as Mayor Johnson
 Denzel Whitaker as Kyle
 Dorian Harewood as Coach Johnson
 Zachary Gordon as Young Mr. Lopart
 Lauren Tom as Nelson and Young Mrs. Lee 
 Rosario Dawson as Debbie 
 Bob Glouberman as Sherman
 Rob Paulsen as Eddie
 Sinbad as Cal
 Michael Donovan as Hank
 Jim Belushi as Sal

Release

Dubbed versions

The series not only aired Spanish-Dubbed versions of its episodes on the "Disney Junior en Univision" sub-block on Univision's Planeta U block (weekends from May 31, 2014 to May 26, 2018), but also aired Russian-Dubbed versions of its episode on Disney Channel Russia's Recognition Disney (later Disney Recognition) block, and also Hebrew-Dubbed versions of its episodes on Hop! Channel, all alongside Mickey Mouse Clubhouse (the block on Disney Channel Russia had the exact same logos as Playhouse Disney (with the exception of the block using the former branding) and Disney Junior (with the exception of the block using the latter branding). When the series was released on Disney+, several dubbed versions (whose languages were derived from Latin) were made available. Languages of these dubs include (but might not be limited to) Spanish, European and Brazilian Portuguese, Norwegian, French, Dutch, Danish and Swedish.

Home media
Nine DVD compilations have been released

See also
Bob the Builder

References

 Book references

External links
 
 
 episode "Valentine's Day Party" New Handy Manny episode "Valentine's Day Party"

2000s American animated television series
2010s American animated television series
2000s American workplace comedy television series
2010s American workplace comedy television series
2006 American television series debuts
2013 American television series endings
2000s Canadian animated television series
2010s Canadian animated television series
2000s Canadian workplace comedy television series
2010s Canadian workplace comedy television series
2006 Canadian television series debuts
2013 Canadian television series endings
American computer-animated television series
American children's animated comedy television series
American children's animated musical television series
American preschool education television series
Canadian computer-animated television series
Canadian children's animated comedy television series
Canadian children's animated musical television series
Canadian preschool education television series
Animated preschool education television series
2000s preschool education television series
2010s preschool education television series
English-language television shows
Television series by Disney
Disney animated television series
Television series by Nelvana
Television series set in shops
Disney Junior original programming
Hispanic and Latino American television